Alexander Wedderburn may refer to:

Alexander Wedderburn, 1st Earl of Rosslyn (1733–1805), Scottish noble
Alexander Wedderburn (businessman) (1796–1843), Scottish-Canadian businessman
Zander Wedderburn (Alexander Allan Innes Wedderburn) (1935–2017), Scottish psychologist